In international humanitarian law and international criminal law, an indiscriminate attack is a military attack that fails to distinguish between military objectives and protected (civilian) objects. Indiscriminate attacks strike both military and protected objects alike, thus violating the principle of distinction between combatants and civilians. They differ from direct (or deliberate) attacks against civilians and encompass cases in which the perpetrators are indifferent as to the nature of the target, cases in which the perpetrators use tactics or weapons that are inherently indiscriminate (e.g., cluster munitions, anti-personnel mines, nuclear weapons), and cases in which the attack is disproportionate, because it is likely to cause excessive civilian casualties and damages to protected objects.

Indiscriminate attacks are prohibited both by the Geneva Conventions Additional Protocol I (1977) and by customary international law. They constitute a war crime under the Rome Statute of the International Criminal Court, and the perpetrators can be prosecuted and held responsible in international and domestic courts.

Concept 

Indiscriminate attacks are military attacks that neglect the distinction between legitimate military targets, on the one side, and persons and objects that enjoy protection under international humanitarian law, on the other.

Protected objects include civilians and civilian objects that do not make an effective contribution to military action and whose destruction does not offer a definite military advantage. Protected objects under international humanitarian law include also objects indispensable to the survival of the civilian population, cultural objects and places of worship, undefended towns, villages, dwellings, or building, works and installations containing dangerous forces, such as nuclear plants, dams and dikes, and the natural environment, which should not be exposed to widespread, long-term, and severe damage.

Indiscriminate attacks strike military objects and protected objects alike, thus violating the principle of distinction between combatants and civilians. Contrary to direct attacks against civilian objects, where the attacker is deliberately trying to hit a civilian object (e.g. to spread terror and break the morale of the population), indiscriminate attacks imply that the attacker is indifferent as to whether the targets are military or not and conducts the operation without regard for any effect it may have on the civilians. Essential to the notion of indiscriminate attack is the state of mind of the attacker, which must be assessed taking into account the so-called fog of war, that is, that the information available at the time of the attack might have been faulty or incomplete. 

The notion of indiscriminate attack is defined in Article 51 Geneva Conventions Additional Protocol I (1977). Indiscriminate attacks are engaged in by employing either tactics or weapons that are indiscriminate, and by launching attacks that are disproportionate.

Examples of the first kind include releasing bombs over enemy territory in the hope of incidentally striking a military objective, firing blindly without ensuring that the target is of military nature, conducting air strikes in situations of limited sight, launching an attack with imprecise weapons against a military objective that is closely surrounded by civilian objects, and using inherently indiscriminate weapons such as cluster munitions and anti-personnel landmines without taking necessary precautions. Also the use of nuclear weapons, while not being as such prohibited under current customary international law, will usually violate the ban on indiscriminate attacks.

Indiscriminate attacks also include attacks that violate the proportionality rule: the so-called disproportionate attacks. In the past, once an attack was aimed at a military objective, any inevitable harm caused to civilians and civilian objects was accepted as "collateral damage". Under current international humanitarian law, however, attacks against a legitimate military objective that lead to collateral damages are subject to the principle of proportionality: losses to the civilian population and damage to civilian objects must not be "excessive in relation to the concrete and direct military advantage anticipated" from the attack, as stated in Article 51 Protocol I. This basic principle is expressed also in Article 57.

Legal status in international and national law 
The prohibition of indiscriminate attacks is set forth in Article 51(4) and (5) of Additional Protocol I and is generally considered a norm of customary international law. While Protocol I is applicable only in international armed conflict and only to the signatory states of that international treaty, the prohibition of indiscriminate attacks as a rule of customary international law is applicable in both international and non-international armed conflicts (civil wars) and is also applicable to states that are not party to Additional Protocol I, such as India and the United States. The prohibition of indiscriminate attacks can also be construed as a necessary consequence of the principle of distinction between combatants and civilians. The principle of distinction belongs to customary international law and justifies a number of analogous rules including prohibitions or limitations on starvation, sieges, and reprisals against civilians, civilian objects, and other protected persons and objects.

The prohibition of indiscriminate attacks is established in numerous national military manuals as well as supported by official statements and reported practice; to carry out such attacks is a criminal offence under the legislation of several countries

Indiscriminate attacks are also defined and punished as a war crime under the Rome Statute of the International Criminal Court.

History

Before World War II 

The reasons behind the prohibition of indiscriminate attacks were already spelled out by one of the founders of international law, Francisco de Vitoria. A passage of his "Second Relectio on the Indians, or on the Law of War" (1532) can be read as an anticipation of the modern principle of proportionality:

The first attempt at codifying a general prohibition of indiscriminate attacks were the 1923 Hague Rules of Air Warfare, which never came into force. They were drafted under the impression of World War I, where recourse to aerial bombing of cities had first become widespread. Strategic bombing by German forces using airships (such as the Zeppelin raids over England and during the siege of Antwerp) and long-range artillery (the "Big Bertha" cannon) raised the issue of how to contain indiscriminate military attacks. The Hague Rules proposed that in cases where the military targets "are so situated, that they cannot be bombarded without the indiscriminate bombardment of the civilian population, the aircraft must abstain from bombardment." While supported by United States and Japan, the Hague Rules were rejected by France and the United Kingdom. At the 1932 World Disarmament Conference, the British government argued that limitations to aerial warfare should not apply to colonies: as Lloyd George declared, "we insisted on reserving the right to bomb niggers".

Before World War II, the deadliest indiscriminate attacks occurred outside Europe, in the Italian invasion of Ethiopia (1935-1936) and in the Japanese invasion of Manchuria (1931-1932) and China (1937-1945). However, it was only with the Spanish Civil War (1936-1939), as consequence of the bombing of Madrid, Guernica and other cities, that indiscriminate bombing of civilian populations first came to the attention of Western audiences. Notwithstanding the efforts by the ICRC and the drafting of the 1938 Convention for the Protection of Civilian Populations Against New Engines of War, which never became legally binding, World War II broke out in the absence of an international regime prohibiting indiscriminate attacks. 

The basic provision limiting aerial warfare was set forth in the 1907 Fourth Hague Convention, and forbade any bombardment of undefended towns, but allowed bombardment of defended towns, or towns that were under attack on the ground. According to international law of the time, "indiscriminate bombing of a defended city or a defended area [was] permissible", as the District Court of Tokyo exposed in Ryuichi Shimoda v. The State (1963). As Neville Chamberlain stated to the House of Commons in June 1938: there was "no international code of law with respect to aerial warfare which is the subject of general agreement."

World War II and aftermath 

At the onset of the war, Franklin D. Roosevelt attempted to mitigate this situation by launching an Appeal to the Belligerents to Refrain from the Bombing of Open Towns. The Appeal was accepted by the German, French and British governments and proved to be quite effective in practice, as during World War II it remained an option to declare a city "open", abandon all defensive efforts and avoid bombing, as it happened in Paris, Brussels, Rome, Athens and elsewhere.

The vast majority of cities were defended and subjected to heavy fire during the war; Heinrich Himmler declared that "No German city will be declared an open city" and hundreds of thousands of civilians died as consequence of massive bombing during the six years of the conflict. From the start, Allied policy was conditioned upon Axis observance of the norm of reciprocity. Reprisals "could lawfully follow any belligerent’s bombardment of civilians, which was the legal ramification of that norm, and with the indiscriminate attacks by Hitler's forces on Poland that began the month of September 1939 the norm of reciprocity "was the only guarantor of a fighting chance at survival in the face of an enemy who disregarded" that brake.

Both the Axis powers and the Allies carried out carpet bombings during the war, such as the attacks on Wieluń, Rotterdam, Warsaw, London, Coventry and on Shanghai and Chongqing, on the one side, and the attacks on Cologne, Berlin, Hamburg, Dresden and on several Japanese cities including Tokyo, on the other. Under current international humanitarian law, most of these bombings would probably qualify as deliberate attacks on civilians rather than as indiscriminate attacks, as they were conducted with the explicit intention of targeting "morale".

In the last 12 months of the war, the German army introduced the paradigmatic case of indiscriminate weapon: the so-called "flying bombs" or "V-weapons" (V-1 flying bomb, V-2 rockets and V-3 cannon). These long-range ballistic missiles could not be directed at a specific military objective but were pointed in the general direction of large metropolitan areas; they "could hardly hit a particular city, let alone a specific point within them". Equally indiscriminate but less effective were the Japanese Fu-Go incendiary balloons – the first intercontinental weapon. The deadliest indiscriminate weapons used during World War II were by far the atomic bombs detonated by the United States over Hiroshima and Nagasaki.

After the war, the German and Japanese leaderships were not pursued for deliberate and indiscriminate attacks on the civilian populations. Their bombing campaigns had arguably been paralleled or surpassed by those carried out by the Allies, and in the Nuremberg and Tokyo indictments no attempt was made to frame indiscriminate attacks as war crimes. During the negotiations of the 1949 Geneva convention, protection of civilians was a controversial subject, and the British representatives opposed any restriction to the freedom to carry out bombing – at the time, both France and the United Kingdom were starting to use bombing as a "policing measure" in the revolting colonies. Between II World War II and 1977 heavy bombings were inflicted by the French in Madagascar during the Malagasy Uprising (1947-1949) and in Algeria during the war of independence (1954-1962), by the British in Kenya during the Mau Mau rebellion (1953-1956) and in Malaya during the national liberation war (1948-1960), by the US-led United Nations forces in Korea (1950-1953), by the United States in Vietnam, especially during Operation Linebacker II (1972).

The 1977 Additional Protocol I to the Geneva conventions 
A general prohibition of indiscriminate attack was established in the 1977 Additional Protocol I. During the diplomatic conference for the drafting of Protocol I, the possibility was referred to of distinguishing the rules applicable to the aggressor from the rules applicable to the victim of the aggression, but several delegations opposed the proposal, which was eventually rejected by the conference. The diplomatic conference attached great importance to the prohibitions of deliberate and indiscriminate attacks on civilians set forth in Article 51, as is shown by the fact that Article 51 is one of the provisions to which no reservations can be made, and by the fact that its violation is qualified as a "grave breach" amounting to a war crime under Article 85.

As of 2022, Protocol I has been ratified by 174 states, with the notable exceptions of India, Iran, Israel, Pakistan, Thailand and the United States. However, the practice of indiscriminate attack continued during the Indonesian occupation of East Timor (1975-1979), the Salvadoran Civil War (1979-1992), as part of the Arab-Israeli conflict (with the Palestinian rocket attacks on Israel, the bombing of Lebanon in July 1981 and the siege of Beirut in 1982). Indiscriminate attacks, and occasionally also deliberate attacks on civilians, were particularly deadly during the Soviet-Afghanistan war: the bombing of Herat alone is said to have killed 20,000 people. In the 1980s and 1990s, indiscriminate attacks were recorded in the "war of the cities" (1984-1988) during the Iran-Iraq war, in the battle of Kabul (1992–1996), in the first Nagorno-Karabakh war between Armenia and Azerbaijan, and in the first and second Chechen war, with the devastating sieges of Grozny in 1994-1995 and 1999-2000.

From the Gulf War onwards 
The 1991 Gulf War and the wars of the former Yugoslavia, including Kosovo, have been regarded as the first attempts to avoid indiscriminate damage in the operations of war; the use of smart bombs was instrumental to that end. Although bombings during the Gulf War destroyed critical infrastructures in Iraq leading to tens of thousands of civilians deaths, the war was widely celebrated for the "most discriminate air campaign in history", with relatively few Iraqi civilians (around 3,000) directly killed by the bombings.

At the times of the Gulf War, many legal scholars doubted that Protocol I codified customary international law and was therefore binding upon the United States, which had not signed the convention. Human Rights Watch published a report arguing that "many of the Protocol’s provisions", including the prohibition of disproportionate and other indiscriminate attacks, "reaffirm, clarify or otherwise codify pre-existing customary law restraints on methods and means of combat and, thus, are binding on all nations regardless of ratification".

The 2009 Gaza war marked by indiscriminate use of rockets by the Palestinians and by indiscriminate airstrikes from the Israeli Defence Forces, as documented in the UN Goldstone report.

During the 2022 Russian invasion of Ukraine, Russia has repeatedly carried out indiscriminate attacks in densely populated areas.

Notes

References

Bibliography

 
 
 

 
 
 
 
 
 
 
 
 

 
 
 
 
 
 
 
 

International humanitarian law
International criminal law
Law of war
War crimes
Aerial warfare
Aerial bombing
War crimes by type